This is a list of Arab-American writers.

Arab-American poets

Arab-American fiction writers

Arab-American nonfiction writers and journalists

See also 

Arab American Book Award
Before Columbus Foundation
Kawkab America
The Society for the Study of the Multi-Ethnic Literature of the United States

References

Bibliography
Grape Leaves: A Century of Arab-American Poetry, edited by Gregory Orfalea and Sharif Elmusa, 1988, University of Utah Press.

Arab